Lord Justice may refer to:
 A member of a collective regency in the temporary absence of the sovereign or viceroy:
 Lords Justices of Ireland, in the absence of the chief governor
 Under the Regency Acts until 1840, if the monarch died while the heir was abroad, Lords Justices would be appointed until the new monarch arrived.
 Lords Justices appointed during the absence of King George I in 1719, when the king was in Hanover
 Style of various senior judges in Britain or Ireland
 Lord Justice of Appeal in England and Wales (since 1875)
 Lord Justice of Appeal in Ireland (1877–1924)
 Lord Justice of Appeal in Northern Ireland (since 1921)
 Lord Justice of Appeal in Chancery (1851–1875)
 Lord Justice of Appeal in Chancery in Ireland (1856–1877)
 Lord Justice Clerk second most senior judge in Scotland
 Lord Justice General senior criminal judge in Scotland, since 1836 merged with Lord President of the Court of Session

See also
 Lord Chief Justice (disambiguation)
 Lord Judge, style of Igor Judge, Baron Judge 
 Lady Justice, an allegorical personification of the moral force in judicial systems 
 Justice Lord (disambiguation)